This is a list of seasons completed by the Nottingham Panthers ice hockey team currently of the British Elite League. This list documents the season-by-season records of the Nottingham Panthers from their inaugural season in 1946–47 to 1959–60 and from their reformation in 1980–81 to the present day. The Panthers were due to begin play in the 1939–40 season but the outbreak of World War II delayed this for seven years. The club played their first competitive game on 22 November 1946, defeating Wembley Monarchs 3-2 at the Ice Stadium.

They played in the English National League for their first eight seasons before becoming part of the amalgamated British National League in 1954. Following the collapse of the British National League in 1960 the Panthers were disbanded. The club were reformed in 1980 when the Sheffield Lancers relocated to Nottingham. Since that time the Panthers have played in the English League South, English National League, British Hockey League, Ice Hockey Superleague and the current Elite Ice Hockey League. A charter member of the Premier League in 1983 at the reintroduction of a national league, Nottingham have held continuous membership of the highest league since then and are the only team to have done so.

In their 48 completed seasons, the Panthers have been regular season champions 4 times, in 1950–51, 1953–54, 1955–56 and 2012–13. The team have won the playoff championship five times, in 1988–89, 2006–07, 2010–11, 2011–12 and 2012–13 and appeared in 8 other playoff finals. They have 30 post season appearances, including 29 consecutively between 1985–86 and the present. Nottingham have won the Autumn Cup 6 times, in 1955–56, 1986–87, 1991–92, 1994–95, 1996–97 and 1998–99 and 7 Challenge Cups in 2003–04, 2007–08 and five in a row between 2009–10 and the present. In total the Panthers have appeared in 29 major finals, winning 17 of them. They have an overall regular season record of 954 wins, 707 defeats, 127 ties and 56 overtime defeats.

Footnotes

References
 
 An ongoing history of the Nottingham Panthers by Peter Walch
 The Internet Hockey Database

Nottingham Panthers
 
Panthers